Dillwynia palustris is a species of flowering plant in the family Fabaceae and is endemic to the Snowy Mountains in New South Wales. It is a weakly ascending to low-lying shrub with glabrous stems, linear, spirally twisted leaves and orange or yellow flowers with red markings.

Description

Taxonomy and naming
Dillwynia palustris was first formally described in 1999 by Peter C. Jobson and Peter H. Weston in the journal Telopea from specimens they collected near Tumbarumba in 1998. The specific epithet (palustris) means "marshy", referring to the preferred habitat of this species.

Distribution and habitat
This dillwynia grows in the ecotone between open woodland with a grassy understorey and swamps with permanent water. It is only known from three areas near the Tumut River catchment, near Talbingo and near Brindabella.

References

palustris
Flora of New South Wales
Plants described in 1999